Anna Xylaloe (Άννα) was the first Empress consort of Manuel I of Trebizond.

Name
"Xylaloe" is a Greek language term for agarwood, the resinous heartwood from Aquilaria trees, large evergreens native to Southeast Asia. Pedanius Dioscorides mentioned it as an Aloe from the Indian subcontinent, probably a confusion resulting from the similarity in name of the two products.

Empress
She is briefly mentioned in the chronicle of Michael Panaretos. Following the death of Manuel "at his exhortation and choice, his son by the empress the lady Anna Xylaloe, the lord Andronikos Komnenos, succeeded to the throne and reigned for three years. And he died in 6774 [AD 1266]." She is the only one of Manuel's three wives Panaretos gives the title of "Empress".

Anna is assumed to have been the first of three wives of Manuel, married to him c. 1235. Her only known son, Andronikos II of Trebizond, preceded his half-siblings George, Emperor of Trebizond, John II of Trebizond and Theodora of Trebizond on the throne. For this reason Andronikos is considered to have been their elder.

Manuel had at least two daughters whose mother is not mentioned. They could be children by Anna or another of his wives. One of the daughters married Demetre II of Georgia, the other married one of his Didebul. Though mentioned in modern genealogies as a name, "Didebul" was actually a title which Christopher Buyers defines as "non-hereditary noblemen of high rank, senior to aznaur, usually enjoyed by one in state service".

Kuršanskis believes that the Trapezuntine embassy Manuel sent to King Louis IX of France in 1253, asking to marry a daughter of his house, provides a terminus post quem for the death of Anna Xylaloe. When King Louis declined the alliance, Kuršanskis argues Manuel then married Irene Syrikaina.

References

External links
Page of "Food in the Ancient World" which gives definition of Xylaloe

13th-century births
1240s deaths
Empresses consort of Trebizond
13th-century Byzantine women
Year of birth unknown
Year of death unknown